Ochterus is a genus of velvety shore bugs in the family Ochteridae. There are more than 70 described species in Ochterus.

Species
These 78 species belong to the genus Ochterus:

 Ochterus acutangulus (Champion, 1901)
 Ochterus aeneifrons (Champion, 1901)
 Ochterus aenifrons (Champion, 1901)
 Ochterus alticola Baehr, 1990
 Ochterus americanus (Uhler, 1876)
 Ochterus atridermis Baehr, 1989
 Ochterus australicus Jaczewski, 1934
 Ochterus bacchusi Baehr, 1990
 Ochterus baehri Rieger, 1977
 Ochterus baltazarae Gapud & San Valentin, 1977
 Ochterus banksi Barber, 1913
 Ochterus barberi Schell, 1943
 Ochterus barrosoi Gapud, 1981
 Ochterus bidentatus Schell, 1943
 Ochterus brachysoma Rieger, 1977
 Ochterus breviculus Nieser & Chen, 1992
 Ochterus bruneiensis Zettel & Lane, 2010
 Ochterus brunneus Hungerford, 1927
 Ochterus caffer Stål, 1855
 Ochterus cheesmannae Baehr, 1990
 Ochterus chiapensis D. Polhemus & J. Polhemus, 2016
 Ochterus costaricensis D. Polhemus & J. Polhemus, 2016
 Ochterus dufourii (Montrouzier, 1864)
 Ochterus eurythorax Baehr, 1989
 Ochterus explanatus D. Polhemus & J. Polhemus, 2016
 Ochterus feae Mancini, 1939
 Ochterus foersteri Kormilev & De Carlo, 1952
 Ochterus grandiusculus Nieser & Chen, 1992
 Ochterus gressitti Kormilev, 1971
 Ochterus homorfos Niesen & Chen, 1999
 Ochterus hungerfordi Schell, 1943
 Ochterus jaczewskii Kormilev, 1971
 Ochterus kokodae Baehr, 1990
 Ochterus latior Baehr, 1990
 Ochterus louisiadae Baehr, 1990
 Ochterus luzonicus Gapud, 2003
 Ochterus magnificus Gapud & San Valentin, 1977
 Ochterus magnus Gapud & San Valentin, 1977
 Ochterus manni Hungerford, 1927
 Ochterus marginatus (Latreille, 1804)
 Ochterus mexicanus D. Polhemus & J. Polhemus, 2016
 Ochterus minor Kormilev, 1973
 Ochterus monteithorum Baehr, 1990
 Ochterus nicobarensis Chandra & Jehamalar, 2012
 Ochterus nigrinus Baehr, 1990
 Ochterus noualhieri Baehr, 1990
 Ochterus obscurus D. Polhemus & J. Polhemus, 2016
 Ochterus occidentalis Baehr, 1990
 Ochterus ovatus D. Polhemus & J. Polhemus, 2016
 Ochterus panamensis D. Polhemus & J. Polhemus, 2016
 Ochterus papuasicus Kormilev, 1972
 Ochterus pardalos Niesen & Chen, 1999
 Ochterus parvus Schell, 1943
 Ochterus paucistriata Baehr, 1990
 Ochterus perbosci (Guérin-Méneville, 1843)
 Ochterus philippinensis Kormilev, 1971
 Ochterus piliferus Kormilev, 1973
 Ochterus polhemusi Gapud, 1981
 Ochterus pseudomarginatus D. Polhemus & J. Polhemus, 2012
 Ochterus pseudorotundus D. Polhemus & J. Polhemus, 2016
 Ochterus rotundus J. Polhemus & M. Polhemus, 1976
 Ochterus santosi Cordeiro & Moreira in Cordeiro et al., 2014
 Ochterus schellae Drake, 1952
 Ochterus secundus Kormilev, 1971
 Ochterus seychellensis D. Polhemus, 1992
 Ochterus shepardi D. Polhemus & J. Polhemus, 2016
 Ochterus signatus D. Polhemus & J. Polhemus, 2012
 Ochterus singaporensis D. Polhemus & J. Polhemus, 2012
 Ochterus smaragdinus D. Polhemus & J. Polhemus, 2016
 Ochterus stysi D. Polhemus & J. Polhemus, 2008
 Ochterus surigaoensis Gapud, 1995
 Ochterus tenebrosus Nieser, 1975
 Ochterus thienemanni Jaczewski, 1935
 Ochterus trichotos Niesen & Chen, 1999
 Ochterus unidentatus Nieser & Chen, 1992
 Ochterus viridifrons (Champion, 1901)
 Ochterus xustos Nieser & Chen, 1992
 Ochterus zetteli Gapud, 2003

References

Further reading

External links

 

Ochteridae
Nepomorpha genera
Articles created by Qbugbot